Leamy Acoustic Art Inc. is Canada's only full-time bell foundry and specializes in smaller bells designed for fine art collections and personal use. The foundry produces only one-off, untuned bells using the lost-wax process.

Leamy Acoustic Art is based in Victoria, British Columbia, Canada. The bells produced by the foundry are sold on-line, or to higher end Fine Art galleries.

Bell foundries
Companies based in Victoria, British Columbia
Musical instrument manufacturing companies of Canada